
Kalisz County is a unit of territorial administration and local government (powiat) in Greater Poland Voivodeship, west-central Poland. It came into being on 1 January 1999 as a result of the Polish local government reforms passed in 1998. Its administrative seat is the city of Kalisz, although the city is not part of the county (it constitutes a separate city county).

As of 2006 its total population is 80,369, out of which the population of Stawiszyn is 1,554 and the rural population is 78,815.

Neighbouring counties
Apart from the city of Kalisz, Kalisz County is also bordered by Konin County to the north, Turek County to the north-east, Sieradz County to the east, Ostrzeszów County to the south, Ostrów Wielkopolski County to the west and Pleszew County to the north-west.

Administrative division
The county is subdivided into 11 gminas (one urban-rural and 10 rural). These are listed in the following table, in descending order of population.

Notable residents

Karolina Pawliczak (born 1976), lawyer and politician

References
Polish official population figures 2006

 
Kalisz